Scrobipalpa albofusca is a moth in the family Gelechiidae. It was described by Povolný in 1971. It is found in Algeria.

The forewings are ochreous-whitish to cream-whitish with sparse dark grey to blackish groups of scales. The hindwings are nearly white, often shining silvery.

References

Scrobipalpa
Moths described in 1971